Franck Alain Djoulou Zohoki (born 1 January 1999) is an Ivorian football player. He plays for Portuguese club Olhanense. He also holds Italian citizenship.

Club career
He joined Udinese before the 2016–17 season and mostly played for their Under-19 squad. He also made some bench appearances for the senior squad during the 2016–17 Serie A and 2017–18 Serie A seasons.

In the summer of 2018 he moved to Torino.

On 11 January 2019, he joined Serie C club Bisceglie on loan with a purchase option. He made his Serie C debut for Bisceglie on 20 January 2019 in a game against Reggina, as a 76th-minute substitute for Luigi Cuppone.

On 28 July 2020 he signed a one-season contract with Schaffhausen in Switzerland.

On 24 September 2021, he signed with Olhanense in Portugal.

References

External links
 

1999 births
Living people
Ivorian footballers
Association football forwards
Udinese Calcio players
A.S. Bisceglie Calcio 1913 players
FC Schaffhausen players
S.C. Olhanense players
Serie C players
Swiss Challenge League players
Campeonato de Portugal (league) players
Ivorian expatriate footballers
Expatriate footballers in Switzerland
Ivorian expatriate sportspeople in Switzerland
Expatriate footballers in Portugal
Ivorian expatriate sportspeople in Portugal